Joscelin III of Edessa (1139 – after 1190) was the titular Count of Edessa, who during his lifetime managed to amass enough land to establish  the Seigneurie of Joscelin.

Early life
He was the son of Joscelin II and his wife Beatrice of Saone. He inherited the title of Count of Edessa from his father, Joscelin II, although Edessa had been captured in 1144 and its remnants (including the Lordship of Turbessel) conquered or sold years before he took the title.

Joscelin lived in the Kingdom of Jerusalem and managed to gather enough land around Acre to set up the Seigneurie of Joscelin.

Royal Guardian
His sister, Agnes of Courtenay, had been the first wife of King Amalric I before he succeeded to the throne, and was the mother of Baldwin IV and Sibylla. In 1164 Joscelin was taken captive by Nur ad-Din Zengi at the Battle of Harim. He remained a prisoner until 1176 when Agnes paid his ransom of 50,000 dinars, probably with support from the royal treasury. His nephew Baldwin then made him seneschal of Jerusalem. He faced some rivalry from the king's paternal kindred, led by Raymond III, Count of Tripoli.

In 1180 Joscelin went as an ambassador to the Byzantine Empire. After the betrothal of Baldwin's half-sister Isabella to Humphrey IV of Toron that year, the Toron estates passed to the crown in exchange for a money fief. Baldwin IV granted part of them, Chastel Neuf, to Joscelin, and awarded Agnes an income from the usufruct, or produce, of Toron. Agnes died in late 1184, a few months before her son.

In 1185, Joscelin became guardian of his young great-nephew, Baldwin V, while Raymond III was regent. Raymond feared that, if he were the child's personal guardian, he would be blamed if he died in his care, because he had a claim to the throne himself. Joscelin, as the king's maternal grandmother's brother, had no claim, but rather had strong family interests in keeping him alive. Additional support came with the arrival of Baldwin's paternal grandfather, William V of Montferrat, from Italy. However, Baldwin seems to have been sickly, and died at Acre in 1186. Joscelin and William escorted his coffin to Jerusalem. Meanwhile, Raymond went to Nablus to attempt a coup with Balian of Ibelin to install Isabella as queen. This failed, and Sibylla was crowned, also crowning her second husband, Guy of Lusignan.

In 1186, Guy and Sibylla granted Chastel Neuf and Toron, with other territory, to Joscelin. He, in turn, gave them as the dowry of his elder daughter, Beatrice, whom he betrothed to Guy’s younger brother, William of Valence. Her younger sister, Agnes, was to marry one of Guy’s nephews, but if Beatrice died while still a minor, William was to marry Agnes instead.

At the Battle of Hattin in 1187, Joscelin commanded the rearguard with Balian of Ibelin. Both escaped the disastrous defeat and fled to Tyre. All his estates were captured by Saladin. Joscelin joined in the siege of Acre in the Third Crusade. He last witnessed a charter on 25 October 1190, after Sibylla's death. There is a strong likelihood that he died during the siege. A month later, Isabella, who was now claiming the crown from Guy, restored Humphrey of Toron's claim to Chastel Neuf and Toron (should they be reconquered) when she accepted the annulment of their marriage. If Joscelin was still alive, he made no recorded objection. However, this seems to have ended the prospect of his daughters' Lusignan marriages. He was definitely dead by October 1200.

Joscelin's seigneurie was acquired by the Teutonic Knights, in 1220.

Marriage and children
After his release from captivity in 1176, Joscelin married Agnes of Milly, (de) third daughter of Henry "the Buffalo" of Milly, (de) Lord of Petra, (and a sister of Stephanie of Milly and Helvis de Milly (fr));  by whom he had two daughters:
 Beatrix de Courtenay (d. aft. 1245), betrothed to William of Valence, brother of Guy of Lusignan, in 1186, but married Otto von Botenlauben
 Agnes de Courtenay, betrothed to a nephew of Guy of Lusignan in 1186, but married, by 1200, William of Amandolea, a Norman from Calabria, who became Lord of Scandeleon

References

Sources

 

Nielen, Marie-Adelaïde  (ed.), Lignages d'Outremer. Paris, 2003.

 

 

1190s deaths
1st house of Courtenay
Counts of Edessa
1139 births
Ambassadors to the Byzantine Empire
Christians of the Third Crusade